Gary Raikes (born 10 August 1958 in Bristol) is the leader of the New British Union (NBU), a fascist revival of Sir Oswald Mosley's British Union of Fascists.  He was previously the leader  in Scotland of the British National Party (BNP) and then Britain First.

In the 2007 Scottish elections, Raikes was a BNP candidate in the North East Scotland region.

Raikes was the BNP's prospective candidate for East Renfrewshire for the 2010 general election. When the BNP decided not to contest the seat, he stood in Aberdeenshire West & Kincardine instead, receiving 513 votes (1.1%).

Raikes' NBU was formed in 2013. He has stated on YouTube that the NBU does not intend to seek power through the ballot box, but would adapt to the conditions around it and maintain its fascist purity. Its constitution says that the NBU aims to be a registered political party but, by 2018, it had not registered with the Electoral Commission.

The party expounds a number of fascist policies and supports fascist groups such as Golden Dawn in Greece. It took part in a rally outside the Greek Embassy in London in support of Golden Dawn. It has few members, and has been accused of appointing to regional officer posts people who were not members or supporters. Raikes has been photographed dressed in full fascist uniform and members are encouraged to dress in Blackshirt style uniforms.

Elections contested
Scottish Parliament election

UK general elections

References

1958 births
Living people
British fascists
British National Party politicians